Rashida Gonzalez Robinson (17 July 1980)  better known as DJ Rashida,  is an American DJ known for her fusion of hip-hop, funk, soul music, dancehall, house music, pop music and rock music.  She has played in London, New York, Tokyo, Dubai, Ibiza, Sydney, Paris and Madrid.

Career

After getting her first pair of turntables in 1998, DJ Rashida has gone on to play her signature fusion of hip-hop, funk, soul, dancehall, and house around the globe at music festivals, concerts, private events & on television.  
 
In 2004 after playing what would be the first of many parties for The Artist, Prince approached her about collaborating. Soon after, (and for the next 10 years) she would tour the world with the superstar, spinning as an opener for his shows,  as well as at his private parties, special events and performing live with him on shows such as The Tonight Show, George Lopez, and The BET Awards. 
 
In addition to her work with Prince, she is a familiar sight at the world’s most important music festivals, playing for thousands at Super Sonic in Tokyo, Good Vibrations in Sydney & the Lollapalooza Festival in Chicago to name a few.  She was the house DJ on MTV’s America’s Best Dance Crew as well as on The Arsenio Hall Show revival.  She is frequently called upon to spin for a bevy of corporate and celebrity clients worldwide. 
 
Rashida has also crossed the globe touring with Grammy-winning & nominated artists Kelis, Cee-Lo Green, and Pharrell Williams.  Today she continues to tour and play for artists & clients around the world, most recently as the opener for Bruno Mars 24k Magic World Tour (US, Europe & Africa.)
 
Acclaimed not only for her deejay skills, but also as a cultural influencer, and fashionista, Rashida has been featured in Vogue Italia, Essence, Vibe, The Source, Flaunt, Remix, Dazed & Confused & Refinery 29 to name a few. She is currently the campaign model for Avant-garde sunglass makers GreyAnt. Rashida has also made cameos as herself in music videos like Prince’s Black Sweat and most recently Finesse by Bruno Mars. 

Robinson was the on-set DJ for the first three seasons of MTV's Randy Jackson Presents America's Best Dance Crew. In 2012, President Barack Obama chose Robinson to be one of three "DJs for Obama," as part of his reelection campaign.

Robinson has been featured in Vogue Italia, People, Us Weekly, Essence, 944 Magazine, Vibe, Flaunt, Remix, and Dazed & Confused.

References 

http://firehousemanagement.com/NEWS/News/Remix%20Magazine.pdf
http://latimesblogs.latimes.com/showtracker/2008/07/americas-best-5.html

1980 births
Living people